Samuel Charles Allsopp, 2nd Baron Hindlip (24 March 1842 – 12 July 1897), was a British businessman and Conservative politician who sat in the House of Commons between 1873 and 1887 when he inherited the peerage.

Life and career
Allsopp was the eldest son of Henry Allsopp, 1st Baron Hindlip, head of the brewery firm of Samuel Allsopp & Sons, of Burton-on-Trent, and his wife Elizabeth Tongue. He was educated at Harrow School and Trinity College, Cambridge, and was a lieutenant in the Derbyshire Yeomanry.  In 1880, he took over the running of the brewery. He was also deputy chairman of the Great Northern Railway.

In 1873, Allsopp was elected Member of Parliament for Staffordshire East and held the seat until 1880. He became a deputy lieutenant of Staffordshire in 1876. He was elected MP for Taunton in 1882. In 1887 he succeeded his father as second Baron Hindlip and gave up his seat when he entered the House of Lords.

Lord Hindlip died in July 1897, aged 55

Family
Hindlip married Georgiana Millicent, daughter of Charles Rowland Palmer-Moorewood, in 1868. He was succeeded in his titles by his son Charles. Lady Hindlip died in 1939. His brother George Allsopp was MP for Worcester, while other brothers Frederic Allsopp and Herbert Allsopp were first-class cricketers.

Coat of arms

See also 
Beerage

References

External links 
 

1842 births
1897 deaths
People educated at Harrow School
Alumni of Trinity College, Cambridge
Barons in the Peerage of the United Kingdom
Conservative Party (UK) MPs for English constituencies
UK MPs 1868–1874
UK MPs 1874–1880
UK MPs 1880–1885
UK MPs 1885–1886
UK MPs 1886–1892
UK MPs who inherited peerages
Deputy Lieutenants of Staffordshire
19th-century English businesspeople